Glossop may refer to:

Places
Glossop, a market town within the High Peak borough of Derbyshire, England.
Old Glossop, the original old town of Glossop, Derbyshire, England
Glossop, South Australia, a small town in the Riverland region of South Australia.

People
Charlie Glossop (1903–1978), rugby league footballer of the 1930s for England, and Wakefield Trinity
Christianne Glossop OBE, Chief Veterinary Officer for Wales, United Kingdom
John Glossop (1871–1934), British naval officer
Mick Glossop, British record producer
Peter Glossop (1928–2008), English baritone opera singer
Ted Glossop (1934–1998), Australian rugby league footballer and coach
Rudolph Glossop (1902–1993), British civil engineer

Fictional characters
Tuppy Glossop, from works of P.G. Wodehouse
Roderick Glossop, from works of P.G. Wodehouse
Lady Glossop, from works of P.G. Wodehouse
Honoria Glossop, from works of P.G. Wodehouse